Marcia Karen Wallace (November 1, 1942 – October 25, 2013) was an American actress and comedian, primarily known for her roles on sitcoms. She is best known for her roles as receptionist Carol Kester on the 1970s sitcom The Bob Newhart Show, Mrs. Carruthers on Full House, and as the voice of elementary school teacher Edna Krabappel on the animated series The Simpsons, for which she won an Emmy in 1992. The character was retired after her death but sporadically appears through archive recording.

Wallace was known for her tall frame, red hair, and distinctive laugh. She had a career spanning five decades on TV, film, and stage. She was a frequent guest on The Merv Griffin Show, which led to her receiving a personal request to appear on The Bob Newhart Show in a role created especially for her. Diagnosed with breast cancer in 1985, she became a cancer activist, and remained so throughout her life.

Early life
Wallace was born in Creston, Iowa, on November 1, 1942, the eldest of three children of Arthur "Poke" Wallace and wife Joann. Her father owned and operated Wallace Sundries, a general merchandise store, where Marcia, her sister Sharon, and brother Jim would often help. While Wallace was in high school, a teacher encouraged her to consider a career in acting after she did well in a school play. Following graduation from Creston High School, Wallace attended Parsons College in Fairfield, Iowa, which had offered her a full scholarship. She was a member of the Delta Nu chapter of Delta Zeta sorority. At Parsons, she majored in English and Theater, performing in Brigadoon and The Music Man.

Career
On the day she graduated from college, Wallace moved from Iowa to New York with $148 in her pocket. To make ends meet, she typed scripts, performed in summer stock, did commercials, and worked as a substitute English teacher in the Bronx. After performing for a year in a Greenwich Village nightclub, Wallace and four fellow entertainer friends formed an improvisational group called The Fourth Wall. In 1968, Wallace appeared for a year off-Broadway with the group. Afterwards, she made several other appearances in improvisational shows, and, after losing  from her previous weight of 230, appeared in a nude production of Dark of the Moon at the avant-garde Mercer Arts Center.

Wallace was a semiregular on The Merv Griffin Show, appearing over 75 times. When the show moved to Los Angeles, Wallace moved with it at Griffin's request. One of these appearances in March 1972 led to a phone call from TV producer Grant Tinker, who offered her a supporting role on The Bob Newhart Show on the recommendation of CBS founder Bill Paley. The role of Carol Kester (later Carol Kester Bondurant), the sarcastic receptionist to Dr. Robert Hartley, Bob Newhart's character, was written specifically for her. Newhart and Wallace reprised their roles from The Bob Newhart Show in "Anything but Cured", an episode of Murphy Brown.

When The Bob Newhart Show ended its six-season run in 1978, Wallace began three decades of television appearances on game shows, including Match Game, Hollywood Squares, Password Plus and Super Password, Celebrity Whew!, Crosswits, Hot Potato, Body Language, The $25,000 Pyramid, Double Talk, Win, Lose or Draw, Tattletales, To Tell the Truth, and Acting Crazy. She was also on special celebrity episodes of the Ray Combs version of Family Feud and the Jim Perry version of Card Sharks. In April 2008, she appeared on the interactive show GSN Live.

Other television roles include: as Darrin's secretary in "Laugh, Clown, Laugh", a Bewitched episode in 1971; two appearances on The Brady Bunch: once as Marcia's teacher in "Getting Davy Jones" and once as the woman who sells Jan a mod wig in "Will the Real Jan Brady Please Stand Up?"; as school principal Mrs. Lyman in two episodes of ALF; as Mrs. Carruthers in a few episodes of Full House. Wallace also had guest appearances on Charles in Charge, Murder, She Wrote, Magnum, P.I., Columbo, and A Different World. On one of the last episodes of Taxi, she portrayed herself, chosen as the ideal date of Rev. Jim Ignatowski. Later, Wallace played the maid on the satirical series That's My Bush!, and, in 2009, appeared on the daytime soap opera The Young and the Restless, playing Annie Wilkes, an inefficient assistant kidnapper.

After The Simpsons started in 1989, Wallace joined the voice acting cast as the voice of Edna Krabappel, whom she played until her death in 2013. In 1992, she received a Primetime Emmy Award for Outstanding Voice-Over Performance for the episode "Bart the Lover".

On film, Wallace appeared in such features as My Mom's a Werewolf, Teen Witch, and Ghoulies III: Ghoulies Go to College. In the 2008 film Tru Loved, she played a high school drama teacher who sponsors a gay–straight alliance.

Wallace's work onstage included An Almost Perfect Person in Los Angeles, which she also produced; a tour of the female version of Neil Simon's The Odd Couple; and productions of Same Time, Next Year, Twigs, It Had to Be You, Supporting Cast, Prisoner of Second Avenue, and Plaza Suite. Wallace made her musical stage debut in the 1983, Sacramento Music Circus production of Gypsy. She returned the following season in Promises, Promises. Other stage productions include Born Yesterday, You're a Good Man, Charlie Brown, Steel Magnolias, and Last of the Red Hot Lovers, in which she played all three female roles at various times. She performed in The Vagina Monologues in Los Angeles, New York, Chicago, and San Diego. In 2013, she voiced the librarian in Monsters University, and in 2014 (posthumously) she portrayed herself in the movie Muffin Top: A Love Story.

Personal life
Wallace married hotelier Dennis Hawley on May 18, 1986, in a Buddhist ceremony. The couple adopted an infant son, Michael Wallace "Mikey" Hawley. Dennis died from pancreatic cancer in June 1992.

Before her marriage, Wallace was diagnosed with breast cancer in 1985, after which she became an activist and lecturer on the subject. On January 27, 2007, Wallace won the Gilda Radner Courage Award from Roswell Park Comprehensive Cancer Center for helping educate Americans about the importance of early cancer detection and inspiring others through her 20 years as a breast cancer survivor.

Wallace was a member of Delta Zeta sorority and was named the Delta Zeta 2010 Woman of the Year at the 2010 Biennial National Convention in Tucson, Arizona. Her autobiography, titled Don't Look Back, We're Not Going That Way, which was published in 2004, recounts the early detection of her breast cancer, the loss of her husband Dennis, her nervous breakdown, her single motherhood, and other experiences such as a history of bulimia. She credited the title of the book to her father, who used the phrase often during her childhood.

Illness, death and funeral
Wallace died from pneumonia and sepsis on October 25, 2013, one week before her 71st birthday. Breast cancer was also listed as a significant condition on her death certificate. Wallace was cremated following a private funeral service.
 
Staff on The Simpsons had reportedly been aware of her ill health. Showrunner Al Jean said, "I was tremendously saddened to learn this morning of the passing of the brilliant and gracious Marcia Wallace." Yeardley Smith, who voices Lisa Simpson, tweeted, "Heaven is now a much funnier place b/c of you, Marcia." Former co-star Bob Newhart commented on his Facebook fan page, "Marcia's death came as quite a shock, she left us too early. She was a talented actress and dear friend[.]" Al Jean said that producers planned to retire her "irreplaceable" character Edna Krabappel. The Simpsons episode "Four Regrettings and a Funeral" was shown on November 3, 2013, and dedicated to her. Wallace had recorded lines for several upcoming episodes, and her final episode, "The Man Who Grew Too Much," aired on March 9, 2014.
In February 2021, it was announced that archival recordings of Marcia Wallace's voice that she provided as Edna Krabappel would be making a final appearance on The Simpsons. The character is mentioned in a chalkboard gag and shown in flashback scenes in the show's 696th episode, entitled "Diary Queen." In an interview with Variety regarding the announcement, Al Jean remarked: "we never got the chance to give sort of a proper goodbye to her in the show, and this is a small attempt to do that."

References

External links

 
 
 
 
 

1942 births
2013 deaths
20th-century American actresses
21st-century American actresses
Actresses from Iowa
American Buddhists
American film actresses
American soap opera actresses
American stage actresses
American television actresses
American television personalities
American women television personalities
American video game actresses
American voice actresses
American women comedians
Converts to Sōka Gakkai
Deaths from breast cancer
Deaths from cancer in California
Deaths from pneumonia in California
Members of Sōka Gakkai
Nichiren Buddhists
Parsons College alumni
People from Creston, Iowa
Primetime Emmy Award winners
20th-century American comedians
21st-century American comedians